Martín Felipe Castagnet is an Argentine writer. He was born in La Plata on May 31, 1986. He obtained a PhD in literature from the National University of La Plata. He is an editor of the bilingual journal The Buenos Aires Review. His first novel Bodies of Summer won the Saint-Nazaire MEET Young Latin American Literature Award and has been translated into English (by Frances Riddle), French, and Hebrew. In 2017, he published his second book Los mantras modernos. Also that year, he was named as one of the Bogota39, a list of the most promising young writers in Latin America.

References

Argentine writers
1986 births
Living people